Stefanie Biskupek-Kräker ( Kräker; 21 April 1960) is a German psychologist and retired gymnast who competed for East Germany at the 1976 and 1980 Olympic Games. Over her career she won four Olympic medals and six world championship medals.

Career
Kräker began competing on the GDR national team in 1976. One of her earliest senior competitions was the 1976 Summer Olympics in Montreal, where she won a team bronze medal.

Following these Olympics Kräker emerged as a major member of the GDR team. In 1977 she became the 1977 GDR national champion and won a bronze on the uneven bars at the 1977 European Championships. At the 1978 World Championships in Strasbourg she won two bronze medals: team and vault. At the 1979 World Championships in Fort Worth she again won bronze with the team and on vault.

The 1980 Olympic Games were Kräker's most successful championship; she received team and bars bronze medals and a silver medal on the vault. Kräker's last major competition was the 1981 World Championships in Moscow where she won team and vault bronze medals.

Kräker was awarded the Patriotic Order of Merit in 1980.

Post-retirement

After her retirement, Biskupek-Kräker became an international judge.

Biskupek-Kräker now works as a child psychologist and psychotherapist in her hometown of Leipzig. She was inducted into the International Gymnastics Hall of Fame in 2011.

Eponymous skill
Kräker has one eponymous skill listed in the Code of Points.

See also
1979 World Artistic Gymnastics Championships
1981 World Artistic Gymnastics Championships
Gymnastics at the 1976 Summer Olympics
Gymnastics at the 1980 Summer Olympics
List of Olympic medalists in gymnastics (women)

References

External links
https://web.archive.org/web/20101111082133/http://www.gymn.ca/gymnasticgreats/wag/kraker.htm

1960 births
Living people
Sportspeople from Leipzig
German female artistic gymnasts
Olympic gymnasts of East Germany
Olympic medalists in gymnastics
Gymnasts at the 1976 Summer Olympics
Gymnasts at the 1980 Summer Olympics
Medalists at the World Artistic Gymnastics Championships
Medalists at the 1980 Summer Olympics
Medalists at the 1976 Summer Olympics
Olympic silver medalists for East Germany
Olympic bronze medalists for East Germany
Recipients of the Patriotic Order of Merit in bronze
Originators of elements in artistic gymnastics